Beta-defensin 103 is a protein that in humans is encoded by the DEFB103A gene.

Function 

Defensins form a family of microbicidal and cytotoxic peptides made by neutrophils. Members of the defensin family are highly similar in protein sequence. This gene encodes defensin, beta 103B, which has broad spectrum antimicrobial activity and may play an important role in innate epithelial defense.

In dogs, the product of the same genetic locus, β-Defensin 103, also plays a role in pigmentation, being an agonist of the melanocortin 1 receptor.

References

Further reading

Defensins